Internet Icon is an American film-making competition reality television show to find "the next Internet icon". The first season aired on the YOMYOMF YouTube channel from 12 June to 16 August 2012. The judges were Ryan Higa and Christine Lakin, and the host was Chester See. The filming of the show took place at the Los Angeles Center Studios. The Brothers Riedell won the first season, with Lana McKissack as runner-up. The contestants of the first season saw an average subscriber boost of 522%.

Top 10 Finalists

Details
The Brothers Riedell (Nick and Chris Riedell) are from the greater San Francisco area. The duo's video, Dr. Moscow, won the brothers the first challenge and a thirty-minute head start for the following challenge. They received this benefit again after the fourth challenge. They also received this benefit in the seventh challenge, but could not use it, due to Chris Riedell having a back injury, and not being able to arrive on time. According to the judges, they have been consistently at the top throughout the competition. They were unanimously selected to move on to the finale, where they then won the first season. As of February 2013, they have over 100,000 subscribers on their YouTube channel. Following season 1, the brothers signed with Big Frame and went on to host season 2 and mentor second season contestants.
Lana McKissack is from around the Los Angeles area. The final standalone contestant, McKissack has received praise from the judges for her comedy skills and personality. She was saved on a 2-1 vote to continue onto the finals. McKissack came second overall.
The Fu Music (Josh and Jacob Fu) are two brothers from Atlanta, Georgia. They created what Ryan called "the best video in the competition" during the third challenge, using stop-motion animation. This led them to gain the extra 30 minute head start for the fourth challenge. They received this benefit again for the sixth challenge. They placed third overall after Ryan Higa and guest judge KassemG voted for McKissack to continue onto the finals.
Team Morgan (Heidi Brucker and Matt Morgan) is a duo from Omak, Washington and Sherman Oaks. The duo received praise for their silent productions and physical comedy. They placed fourth overall.
Dayside Productions (Karim, Shawn, Girard and Gru) is a group of four from the Queens area. The group caused controversy among the show's audience for excessively celebrating after being told they were in the top ten finalists. Further controversy was created when the group broke a table belonging to the Los Angeles Center Studios. In the same episode, Karim, a member of Dayside, openly wept while facing elimination in front of the judges; Lakin subsequently asked Karim why he was so emotional. More controversy was caused when Dayside caused many of the actors to complain about them. They were eliminated after turning in a video that, according to the judges, "didn't make sense". They placed fifth overall. Karim later participated in the second season of Internet Icon, making it to the top 100, but no further.
Kyle Hatch is from Salt Lake City, Utah. Kyle caused controversy for being eliminated two episodes after Marlin Chan, a fan favorite contestant, despite being questioned by the judges as to whether or not he actually met the required challenge. He placed sixth overall.
Justin James Hughes is from Los Angeles, California. Hughes was eliminated after not showing up for judgement on his third video due to a previous commitment. Having many fans, this caused outrage in the comment section when the video was uploaded. He placed seventh overall.
Marlin Chan is from Stockton, California. Marlin was eliminated after the second challenge and placed eighth overall. He later participated in the second season of Internet Icon as part of a group, making it to the top 100, but no further.
Joey Held is originally from Chicago, Illinois. Held's video How to Pour Cereal had technical problems in the preliminary round. Held later asked the producers if he could show his video on his own laptop, which was allowed. After being shown the video, Higa and Lakin retracted their earlier statements about Held's video, with Higa even saying "that [it] went from the bottom of [his] list [... to] the top.". Held was eliminated after the first challenge and placed ninth overall.
Tahir Moore is from St. Louis, Missouri. Moore was the first to be eliminated, after being told that he was not quite technically ready. He placed tenth overall. He later hosted the main interviews of many cast and crew of YOMYOMF productions prior to the finale filming at the "Orange carpet".

Episodes

Overview

Challenge One: "The Word Challenge"
The first challenge was to use five of ten selected words in a video. Two contestants were eliminated in this round.

Challenge Two: "The Infomercial Challenge"
The second challenge was to create an infomercial.

Challenge Three: "The Prop Challenge"
The third challenge was to use five selected props from the Iconography room and use them in the video. Justin James Hughes was disqualified in this round because he wasn't present at the elimination due to prior-organised filming of a television show.

Challenge Four: "The Topical Challenge"
The fourth challenge was to turn an article from a newspaper into a video.

Challenge Five: "The Judges' Choice Challenge"
The fifth challenge was to create a video as per chosen by the judges. Dayside Productions were challenged to make a horror video, the Fu Music had to make a video in one take - no edit cuts, Lana McKissack had to make a character-driven video in the style of a documentary, Team Morgan had to make a silent video, and the Brothers Riedell had to make an instructional video.

Challenge Six: "The Set Challenge/Surprise Promotional Challenge"
The sixth challenge was to make a video entirely in one set (the Fu Music in the Morgue; Lana McKissack in the Bar/Restaurant; Team Morgan in the jail/interrogation room; the Brothers Riedell in the court room). However, during the challenge, the producers surprise challenged the contestants with a one-hour challenge: to make a trailer for Internet Icon.

Challenge Seven: "The Guest Star Challenge"
The seventh challenge was to create three videos:
Include all of the actors in the Iconography Room, and Damien Dante Wayans.
Make a music-based video.
Make a vlog.

Challenge Eight: "Finale"
The eighth and final challenge was to make any video that the contestants wished. The winner was later announced in front of an audience, with various interviews with all Top 10 contestants.

The finale was scheduled to air 16 August 2012 at 8PM EST, but due to uploading errors it wasn't uploaded until early morning of 17 August 2012. It was sponsored by TheTruth.com.

Elimination Chart

References

Internet Icon